Mark Quigley (born 27 October 1985) is an Irish former professional footballer who played for Millwall, Shamrock Rovers (over 2 spells), St Patrick's Athletic (over 2 spells), Bohemians (over 2 spells), Dundalk, Sligo Rovers and Derry City.

Career
Quigley came to prominence as a schoolboy with noted Dublin club Belvedere from where he signed for Millwall in 2003. He made his Football League debut as a substitute against Stoke City on 19 February 2005. After a further 8 appearances he moved home on loan to Shamrock Rovers for the rest of the 2005 League of Ireland season making his League of Ireland debut on 19 August and he went on to make a total of 12 appearances under Roddy Collins.

Mark signed for St. Patrick's Athletic in 2006 and made a huge breakthrough during the 2007 season. He ended the campaign as second top scorer in the league and was voted PFAI Young Player of the Year. He was also called up to the Ireland Under 23 squad for the game against Northern Ireland and reportedly impressed the watching national coach Giovanni Trapattoni.

He scored three goals for St. Pat's during their 2008-09 UEFA Cup campaign, netting against JFK Olimps and home and away against IF Elfsborg.

After 148 appearances for St. Pats in all competitions, Quigley moved to Dalymount Park and Bohs' in time for the 2010 season.

Quigley made a slow start to his Bohs career and it was 8 May before he netted his first league for the club when scoring the winner against Sligo Rovers. Despite playing as a forward for most of his career, Pat Fenlon decided to use Mark as a winger and this played a part in a strike rate of only 4 goals in 34 league appearances for the Gypsies. When his contract expired at the end of the 2010 season, Quigley was released by Bohemians.

Dundalk
On 4 December 2010 he signed for Dundalk along with fellow Bohemians teammate Jason Byrne in a one-year deal.

Sligo Rovers
Quigley signed for Sligo Rovers on 14 December 2011, to fight for a place alongside Danny North. Quigley scored the winning goal from the penalty spot against his former club Saint Patrick's Athletic to clinch Sligo's first league title since 1977.

He won the PFAI Player of the Year for the 2012 League of Ireland season.

Return to Inchicore
In December 2013, he re-signed for St. Patrick's Athletic.

Derry City
After spending the first half of the 2015 League of Ireland season out injured, Quigley signed for Derry City on Monday 6 July 2015.

Return to Bohemians
After a short, unsuccessful spell at Derry City Quigley returned to Dublin and Bohemians in December 2015. He made his second debut for the club in the opening game of the 2016 season against Cork City. Quigley scored his first goals since his return to the club on the 18th of March, netting a brace against Wexford Youths.

Retirement
Quigley played for and later managed his local club Sheriff YC after finishing his professional career.

Honours

Club
Sligo Rovers
 League of Ireland (1): 2012

Bohemians
 Setanta Sports Cup (1): 2009–10

Shamrock Rovers
 Setanta Sports Cup (1): 2013
 League of Ireland Cup (1): 2013
 Leinster Senior Cup (1): 2013

St Patrick's Athletic
 FAI Cup (1): 2014
 FAI President's Cup (1): 2014
 Leisnter Senior Cup (1): 2014

Individual
 PFAI Young Player of the Year (1): 2007
 PFAI Players' Player of the Year (1):2012

References

External links
Soccerbase Profile

1985 births
Living people
Association footballers from County Dublin
Republic of Ireland association footballers
Belvedere F.C. players
Millwall F.C. players
Shamrock Rovers F.C. players
St Patrick's Athletic F.C. players
Bohemian F.C. players
Dundalk F.C. players
Sligo Rovers F.C. players
Derry City F.C. players
English Football League players
League of Ireland players
Republic of Ireland under-23 international footballers
Association football forwards